Piotr Stoiński  may refer to:

Pierre Statorius (1530–1591), or Piotr Stoiński Sr., French grammarian and theologian
Piotr Stoiński Jr. (1565–1605), his son, Polish Socinian Unitarian writer